Shimei Burton (born 3 February 1975) is a Jamaican cricketer. He played in one List A and two first-class matches for the Jamaican cricket team from 1995 and 1997.

See also
 List of Jamaican representative cricketers

References

External links
 

1975 births
Living people
Jamaican cricketers
Jamaica cricketers
People from Manchester Parish